Culver is a town in Marshall County, Indiana,  United States. Culver is part of Union Township, which also includes the communities of Burr Oak, Hibbard, Maxinkuckee and Rutland. The population of Culver was 1,129 at the 2020 United States Census.

History
Culver was originally called Union Town, and under the latter name was laid out in 1844. It was later renamed for Henry Harrison Culver, founding head of the Culver Military Academy.

The Culver Commercial Historic District and Forest Place Historic District are listed on the National Register of Historic Places. One of the buildings covered in the National Register is the post office, which contains a mural completed by Jessie Hull Mayer as part of the Section of Painting and Sculpture′s projects, later called the Section of Fine Arts, of the Treasury Department. Arrival of the Mail in Culver was completed in 1938 and featured students from the military academy and other residents looking at their mail.

Geography
Culver is located at  (41.217340, -86.421726).

Demographics

2010 census
As of the 2010 United States Census, there were 1,353 people, 598 households, and 354 families in the town. The racial makeup of the town was 95.8% White, 1.2% African American, 0.4% Asian, 0.9% from other races, and 1.8% from two or more races. Hispanic or Latino of any race were 2.4% of the population.

There were 598 households, of which 25.3% had children under the age of 18 living with them, 44.1% were married couples living together, 10.4% had a female householder with no husband present, 4.7% had a male householder with no wife present, and 40.8% were non-families. 37.1% of all households were made up of individuals, and 17.9% had someone living alone who was 65 years of age or older. The average household size was 2.15 and the average family size was 2.77.

The median age in the town was 47.7 years. 19.2% of residents were under the age of 18; 7% were between the ages of 18 and 24; 18.6% were from 25 to 44; 29.6% were from 45 to 64; and 25.6% were 65 years of age or older. The gender makeup of the town was 45.4% male and 54.6% female.

2000 census
As of the 2000 United States Census, there were 1,539 people, 655 households, and 410 families in the town. The racial makeup of the town was 96.04% White, 0.91% African American, 0.65% Native American, 0.58% Asian, 0.06% Pacific Islander, 0.71% from other races, and 1.04% from two or more races. Hispanic or Latino of any race were 2.21% of the population.

There were 655 households, out of which 26.0% had children under the age of 18 living with them, 48.7% were married couples living together, 10.2% had a female householder with no husband present, and 37.4% were non-families. 35.0% of all households were made up of individuals, and 18.0% had someone living alone who was 65 years of age or older. The average household size was 2.25 and the average family size was 2.88.

The town population contained 22.5% under the age of 18, 5.8% from 18 to 24, 23.9% from 25 to 44, 24.6% from 45 to 64, and 23.1% who were 65 years of age or older. The median age was 43 years. For every 100 females, there were 88.8 males. For every 100 females age 18 and over, there were 80.2 males.

The median income for a household in the town was $33,047, and the median income for a family was $46,190. Males had a median income of $34,583 versus $24,453 for females. The per capita income for the town was $18,938. About 8.5% of families and 10.4% of the population were below the poverty line, including 11.5% of those under age 18 and 7.0% of those age 65 or over.

Education
The town has a lending library, the Culver-Union Township Public Library.

Notable people
 Donald B. Easum, United States diplomat and writer, was born in Culver.
 Greg Pence, brother of vice-president Mike Pence, has resided in Culver.
 Hank Steinbrenner and Hal Steinbrenner, the sons of George Steinbrenner, were both born in Culver.
 John D. Zeglis, American businessman, currently resides in Culver.

References

External links
 Town of Culver
 Chamber of Commerce
 Site on city-data.com

Towns in Marshall County, Indiana
Towns in Indiana